The Jackbox Party Pack is a series of party video games developed by Jackbox Games for many different platforms on a near-annual release schedule since 2014. Each installment contains five games that are designed to be played in groups of varying sizes, including in conjunction with streaming services like Twitch which provide means for audiences to participate.

History 
Jellyvision had been well-established for its You Don't Know Jack series of "irreverent trivia" games. Though the series had been successful in the late 1990s, Jellyvision had not been able to make the transition easily from computer to home console games, and by 2001, all but six employees of Jellyvision had been laid off. The company focused on developing business solution software, specifically offering software to its clients to help assist their customers for complex forms or other types of support.

By 2008, Jellyvision, now named The Jellyvision Lab, saw that mobile gaming was booming, so it created a small subsidiary, Jellyvision Games, to rework You Don't Know Jack, first for consoles in its 2011 version, then for mobile and Facebook users with the now-defunct 2012 iteration. This last version was a critical success, and led the studio to focus on developing similar games, rebranding the studio by 2013 as Jackbox Games.

Among its one-off games including Lie Swatter, Clone Booth, and Word Puttz, generally designed as single player games or played asynchronously with other players. One key game that followed this was its 2014 game Fibbage, which allows up to eight simultaneous players, one of whom can use live streaming or play with people in the same room. Other players would participate by using a web browser or mobile device to connect to the streaming player's game through Jackbox's servers and which to provide their answers.

With the success of Fibbage, Jackbox Games decided that they could offer these games in packs, reworking older games to use the streaming capabilities and adding in new games. This formed the basis of the Jackbox Party Pack, with the first pack released in 2014 including updated versions of You Don't Know Jack, Fibbage, a reworked version of Lie Swatter for its multiplayer approach, and two new games. The company saw this as a new development model that allowed them to provide new packs on an annual basis, play around with different game formats, and provide higher value to consumers over one-off games.

Subsequent Jackbox Party Packs have included improvements of existing games, support for more players including the addition of audience participation through the same connectivity approach, better support for content management for streams (as to remove offensive terms in responses, for example), and the ability to create custom games. A key part of Party Pack games is to streamline the ability for players to get into games, and according to Jackbox Games' CEO Mike Bilder, they spent about a year working on building their servers and software to provide a flexible architecture for the player-side mobile and web interface to expand for any of the games, and to avoid having players download any type of app to get started.

According to Allard Laban, creative chief for both Jellyvision Labs and Jackbox Games, they select games to include in the packs through a combination of allowing the team to submit fleshed-out ideas, and through testing various ideas through pen-and-paper trials; Laban stated that for Party Pack 4, they had over fifty play-tested concepts which they narrowed down to four new games, rounding out the package with an improved version of Fibbage. Some games, such as Fakin' It, took multiple years to get the right gameplay and mechanics down to make it an appropriate game for inclusion.

The first six Jackbox Party Packs gained renewed attention during the COVID-19 pandemic as a way for many people to keep up social interactions while maintaining social distancing. Starting on May 1, 2020, Jackbox ran ten special Celebrity Jackbox live streams to support COVID-19 charities, with the celebrities playing various Jackbox Party Pack games alongside audience viewers. Jackbox said that its playerbase doubled from 100 million players in 2019 to 200 million by October 2020 due to society's shutdown. Jackbox Games improved server capacity and streaming service usability, and internationalized a standalone version of Quiplash 2 InterLASHional for French, German, Italian, and Spanish languages.

Jackbox released a Twitch extension for streamers in December 2020 which allows viewers of their channel to directly participate in Jackbox games from the Twitch interface.

Gameplay 

Most games in The Jackbox Party Pack are designed for online play, requiring only one person to own and launch the game. Remaining players can be local and thus see the game via the first player's computer or console, or can be remote, watching the game be played through streaming media services. All players – whether local or remote – use either web-enabled devices, including personal computers and mobile or tablet devices, to enter a provided "room code" at Jackbox's dedicated servers to enter the game, or can use a Twitch extension controlled by the streamer to let viewers play directly via the Twitch viewer. Games are generally limited to 4-8 active players, but any other players connecting to the room after these players are connected become audience participants, who can impact how scoring is determined and influence the winner.

Each game generally has a period where all players are given a type of prompt. This prompt appears on the individual devices and gives players sufficient time to enter their reply or draw as necessary, and can be set to account for forced streaming delays that some streaming services require. The game then collects and processes all the replies, and frequently then gives players a chance to vote for the best answer or drawing; this is often where the audience may also participate by voting as a group. Games proceed for a number of rounds, and a winner, generally with the highest score at the end, is announced.

Eight of the nine games are developed with a default ESRB Teen rating, with a family-friendly option to censor certain questions and player input, however Party Pack 8 has an ESRB Everybody 10+ rating.

Games

Consoles/Computers 
All Packs are available on PlayStation 4, Xbox One, Microsoft Windows, macOS and Linux, Apple TV, iPad, Android TV, Amazon Fire TV, and Nvidia Shield TV. Party Pack 1 is the only one available on the Xbox 360. Party Pack 1 and Party Pack 2 are the only two Packs available on PlayStation 3. Starting on April 13, 2017, the Packs are available on the Nintendo Switch. Starting in January 2018, the Packs are available on Xfinity X1. Starting on October 14, 2021, the Packs are available on PlayStation 5 and Xbox Series X/S. From November 16, 2021 to December 21, 2021, the Packs became available on Stadia.

The Jackbox Party Pack (2014) 
The Jackbox Party Pack was released on PlayStation 3, PlayStation 4, and Xbox One on November 19, 2014, and for Microsoft Windows and macOS on November 26, 2014. The Xbox 360 version was released on November 3, 2015, alongside retail editions for these console platforms published by Telltale Games. The Nintendo Switch version was released on August 17, 2017.

You Don't Know Jack 2015 is for 1–4 players and is based on the standard format for You Don't Know Jack games. Up to four players are tasked to answer multiple choice trivia questions presented obscurely in the game's "high culture meets pop culture" format. Players earn in-game money for answering correctly in a shorter amount of time and lose money for wrong answers. Failing to answer doesn't give a player any money. Multiplayer games also feature "screws", where one player can force another player to answer immediately and can earn a bonus if the "screwed" player answers incorrectly or fails to answer. The player with the most money at the end wins.

Drawful is for 3–8 players and is a drawing game. Each round starts with each player individually being given a playful phrase and a drawing canvas on their local device. They have a short amount of time to draw out that phrase. Following this, each picture is presented to all players, and the players except for the artist must enter a phrase they think the picture represents. Then, all those replies, along with the actual phrase for that picture, are presented to the players to make their vote of what they think the original phrase was. The artist of the picture gets points for every other player that guessed their original phrase, while those who wrote other phrases get points for votes their phrase gets. If a player selects a decoy answer, they don't get any points. The player with the most points at the end wins.

Word Spud is for 2–8 players and is a word association game. A word is presented and one player, at a time, comes up with a word that is associated with it. The remaining players vote if the association is good or not and the player who came up with the association gets points if it gets the most likes and loses points if it gets the most dislikes. From there, the next player starts from the new word to come up with a new association, and the game continues. The player with the most points at the end wins.

Lie Swatter is for 1–100 players and is a multiplayer version of the single-player mobile app that Jackbox Games released prior to The Jackbox Party Pack. The game challenges up to 100 players to correctly guess if presented trivia statements are true or not, "swatting" those that are false. Players earn points for correct answers with the fastest player earning additional points. The player with the most points at the end wins.

Fibbage XL is for 2–8 players and is an expansion of the standalone game that Jackbox Games released prior to the pack with new sets of questions. In the first two rounds of the game, each player selects from one of five random categories, and an obscure fact is presented to all players with a missing word or phrase to complete it. Each player uses their local device to enter a reply for those missing words; if they enter the actual right answer, they are asked to enter something different, and if they can't enter an answer before the timer runs out, they can press the "lie for me" button and get to choose between two game-generated choices. Then, the game presents all replies, including the correct one, to the players, who then select what they think is the right answer. Players score points for selecting the right answer, but can also score if other players select their reply, so players are encouraged to provide seemingly correct answers for their replies. Players lose points for selecting the false answer the game wrote itself. In the final round, "The Final Fibbage", one more question is provided for all of the players to answer. The player with the most points at the end wins.

The Jackbox Party Pack 2 (2015) 
The Jackbox Party Pack 2 was released for Microsoft Windows, macOS, PlayStation 3, PlayStation 4, and Xbox One on October 13, 2015. The Nintendo Switch version was released on August 17, 2017.

Fibbage 2 is for 2–8 players. As compared to its predecessor, Fibbage 2 introduces new sets of questions and the ability for the audience to vote on answers which can provide an extra scoring boost to the players. A new option called the Defibrillator permits players to delete all of the answers except one and the truth of the selection for one question.

Earwax is for 3–8 players. In each round, one player is selected as the judge and is given a choice of five prompts. The prompt is presented to the other players, and these players are each given six random sound effects. Each player then selects two of the sound effects, in order, as a reply to the prompt. The judge player selects which combined sounds make the most humorous or fitting answer, and that selected player earns a point. The first player to earn three points wins.

Bidiots is for 3–6 players. It is a spiritual successor to Drawful. Players start by drawing images for randomly-assigned categories. Players then use in-game money to bid on these images as if at an art auction, trying to be the highest bidder for the image that matches specific categories, if they bid until they couldn't anymore, they get the image and the artist of the image earns money. Players can use screws (similar to the You Don't Know Jack franchise) to force other players to bid, and if players run out of money, they can take out a predatory loan to try to compete through the rest of the game. After the number of lots allotted (8 for 3 players, 10 for 4 players, 12 for 5–6 players) the images the player bought give them more money. The player with the most money at the end wins, unless one or more players take out three predatory loans, which make them lose money.

Quiplash XL is for 3–8 players. Jackbox Games released it as a standalone game prior to the pack, and it was included in this pack's release along with previous DLC (Quip Pack 1) and "over 100 brand new prompts". In the game's first two rounds, each player is given two prompts to provide an answer to; the prompts are given so that two players see each prompt. Players provide what they believe is a funny answer to each prompt. Then, all players and the audience are shown a prompt and the two answers provided. They vote for the answer they think is the best quip. Points are gained by the percentage of votes between the two players, and bonus points are awarded from a possible "quiplash" if they get all the votes. Entering the same thing as an opponent in a prompt doesn't award any points. In the final round, "The Last Lash," all players respond to the same prompt, and vote three times for the best answers of those presented. The player with the most points at the end wins.

Bomb Corp. is for 1–4 players. One player is an employee of a bomb factory that must deactivate inadvertently-started bombs as they come off the assembly lines, while other players are employees that are given different sets of instructions to help deactivate it. The instructions are specifically obtuse and potentially conflicting, requiring careful communication between players.

The Jackbox Party Pack 3 (2016) 
The Jackbox Party Pack 3 was released during the week of October 18, 2016 for Microsoft Windows, macOS, PlayStation 4, Xbox One, certain Android devices, and Apple TV. It was subsequently released on the Nintendo Switch on April 13, 2017. A version for Xfinity's X1 set-top box was available in January 2018.

Quiplash 2 is for 3–8 players. As compared to its predecessor, Quiplash 2 introduces new prompts, the ability for the hosting player to create new prompts, the ability for the host to censor players, the "safety quip" feature that incorporates the ability for the player to have a quip written for them, and new "Last Lash" rounds that either requires players to come up with a meaning of a given acronym, complete a caption in a comic strip, or come up with something clever using a given word in a prompt; unlike the previous game's final round, medals determine the points distributed to the players.

Trivia Murder Party is for 1–8 players and has a lighthearted theme of a horror thriller (similar to the Saw franchise). Each round includes a multiple-choice trivia question, with players earning in-game money for being correct, and then a subsequent "Killing Floor" mini-game if any "living" player got the question wrong. The mini-game may cost the lives of one or more remaining players, who then otherwise continue in the game as ghosts. The endgame starts when only one player remains alive, where all players now try to escape along a darkening hallway: each question provides three possible answers to a category, and each player determines which answers belong to it; the leading player only sees two answers, giving trailing players the opportunities to take the lead and escape first. After nine questions are survived, a loser wheel minigame is drawn if there is more than one player alive before the endgame. If only one player remains alive after all other players died in 5 or fewer questions, the player has to survive two more to make it to the endgame. But if the last player dies after not successfully surviving in a minigame, it is "game over" for everyone.

Guesspionage is for 2–8 players and is a percentage-guessing game. In the first two rounds, each player in turn, guesses what percentage of people have a certain quality or do a certain activity, such as texting while driving. If there are more than 5 audience members, they are surveyed prior to the turns to get these percentages, otherwise earlier survey results by Jackbox Games are used. Once the current player makes their guess, the other active players can consider if they are higher or lower than the guessed value, including opining if they are off by more than a certain amount. Points are scored by the current player based on how close they are and by the other players based on the guessing of higher or lower. Points are also scored by the current player that guessed the exact percentage. In the final round, one question with 9 choices is given, and the players all have to pick what they think are the three most popular answers, with points awarded based on the answer's popularity. The player with the most points at the end wins.

Fakin' It is for 3–6 players and is a local multiplayer game where each player has their own connected device. In each round, one player is randomly selected to be the Faker, and all players except the Faker are given instructions that involve some type of physical action, such as raising a hand or making a face; the Faker is not given this information but instead must figure out from the other players what to do. Each player then attempts to guess who the Faker was by their actions, with the round ending if the Faker is guessed correctly by all other players, or successfully escaping, after which points are awarded for if at least one player guesses the Faker correctly, everyone guesses correctly, and/or if the Faker escapes capture in each task out of the number allotted (3 for 4–6 players, 2 for 3 players). After the first round, players may select any action they like. The final round is always "Text You Up", where each player answers a number of open-ended questions, while the Faker is given different questions which can have overlapping answers with the questions given to the players. (For example, the other players may be asked about a positive trait about themselves, while the Faker would be asked what traits they would look for in a companion.) The player with the most points at the end wins.

Tee K.O. is for 3–8 players and is a drawing-based game. Each player starts by drawing three images of anything they want, though the game provides suggestions to help. Then each player has a chance to enter several short sayings or slogans. Subsequently, each player is then given two or more random drawings and two or more random sayings, and selects the pair that best fits together as printed on a T-shirt. These designs are then put into a one-on-one voting battle with all players and audience members to determine the best-voted T-shirt design and the design that had the longest voting streak. If the T-shirt gets all votes, the player who drew the shirt gets a "shirtality". A second round of drawing, slogan writing, pairing, and voting is performed. The winning designs from each round are then put against each other to determine the ultimate winning design. After the game, players are able to order custom printed T-shirts.

The Jackbox Party Pack 4 (2017) 
The Jackbox Party Pack 4 was released during the week of October 17, 2017, for Microsoft Windows, macOS, PlayStation 4, Xbox One, Nintendo Switch, various Android devices, and Apple TV. A version for Xfinity's X1 set-top box was available in January 2018.

Fibbage 3 is for 2–8 players and is the third game in the Fibbage series. The game includes new interactivity with the audience by letting them add their own lies to the selection and new "Final Fibbage" facts with two missing words or phrases instead of one. It has a new separate game mode called Fibbage: Enough About You that is for 3-8 players and replaces the game's traditional questions with questions relating to the players. In the first round of this mode, players start writing a truth about themselves and then the other players have to write a lie and then find the truth about one of the players. The player who wrote the truth about themselves earns points for every other player that guessed it correctly. In the final round of this mode, all players have to write a truth and a lie about themselves and then the other players have to find which statement is true about the player.

Survive the Internet is for 3–8 players and is a game of user-generated content that takes place on a fictional version of the Internet. In the first three rounds, one player receives a question that asks their opinion on a topic. Their answer is taken out of context and sent to another player, who is then told to determine what the reply was in response to as if they were on a specific site such as social media, forums, jobs and news, attempting to twist the reply as best they can to make the first player look bad. All players and the audience are then presented with the pairs of original replies and the guessed topic, and vote on which pairing is the most ridiculous. Each vote gains a big number of points for the second player that twisted the reply and a smaller number of points for the first player that provided the reply. If the pair of replies and the guessed topic gets the most votes, the second player that twisted the reply gets a "best burn" and a bigger number of bonus points and the first player that provided the reply gets an "ultimate sacrifice" and smaller number of bonus points. The final round is always the "Photosharing site", where players are given a question with two choices and the photo based on their selected choice is sent to another player who has to comment about it. The player with the most points at the end wins, having "survived the Internet".

Monster Seeking Monster is for 3–7 players and has a horror theme where each player is a disguised monster attempting to date other players. In each of the six rounds, players start by sending up to four messages to other players; the non-playable monster, the robot, if the audience is turned off for 3–4 player games, generates messages right after a player texts to it, the audience, if turned on and participating, uses mad lib-style prompts to select phrases to send. Following this, each player selects one other player they would date based on those replies. If two players selected each other, they both earn a heart. Additional scoring bonuses and effects due to the hidden monster power are also accounted for. A rejection happens when two players select other players instead of each other, or if one or more players don't select anyone (they also lose a heart if they don't select any players to date). From the end of the second round on, the monster form of the leading player whose monster form is yet unknown, is revealed to all. The player with the most hearts at the end wins, unless other special conditions are met relating to the player's monster.

Bracketeering is for 3–16 players and is a tournament-style game for up to sixteen players, played across three rounds. In the first round, players are presented with a prompt to complete with the best or funniest answers they can. (The number of answers allotted are 2 for 3–4 players and 1 for 5–16 players.) These answers are randomly placed on a tournament-style grid (8 for 3–8 players and 16 for 9–16 players). The players are then given one of the tournament matchups and predict which answer will win that matchup. Subsequently, each match is then presented to all players and the audience. The answer that gets the highest percentage of votes wins, with the percentage that it wins by tied to how much in-game money those players that guessed that match correctly get. If two, three or four answers have the same number of votes, all players have to tap on their device as fast as they can to cheer for their answer. Subsequent matchups use these best answers going forward. After the final matchup, the player that provided the winning reply gets an additional cash bonus. The second round is a "blind bracket" where the players are presented with a prompt, but the brackets are based on a different, related prompt using those answers. The final round is a "triple blind bracket" where the prompt at each level of the bracket changes. The player with the most money at the end wins.

Civic Doodle is for 3–8 players and is an art game similar to Drawful and Bidiots with two players drawing the same piece of art simultaneously. In the first two rounds, a start of a doodle is presented to two randomly selected players, and they have a short time to draw atop that; this is done in real-time allowing the other players and the audience to provide feedback on either drawing in the form of preselected emoji. After the timer is done, the players and audience vote for which drawing is better, with points awarded to both players based on how many votes they received, as well as an additional point bonus based on the emoji votes. Subsequently, two more players then draw atop the highest-voted picture. After a number of matchups, depending on how many players are in the game, not counting the audience members, players have to suggest a title for the highest-voted picture. Following this, the players and the audience vote for their favorite title. The final round has all players given a title and a start of a doodle and they have to draw the features the game requested. The player with the most points at the end wins. After the game, players can do a free play draw or order custom merch.

The Jackbox Party Pack 5 (2018) 
The Jackbox Party Pack 5 was released on October 17, 2018, for PlayStation 4, Xbox One, Nintendo Switch, Microsoft Windows, macOS, Linux, Apple TV, iPad, Amazon Fire TV, Nvidia Shield TV, and Xfinity X1.

You Don't Know Jack: Full Stream is for 1–8 players and is the newest iteration of the You Don't Know Jack franchise. The game is updated to feature similar streaming-friendly features as most other Party Pack games. This includes support for up to eight players and an audience. As the game now uses both mobile devices and computers as controllers, text-based questions like the "Gibberish Question" return, new and classic question types are present.

Split the Room is for 3–8 players and is a scenario game. In the first two rounds, players are presented with a hypothetical solution with a fill-in-the-blank component. Players then try to fill in the blank such that when the question is presented to the other players, the yes or no responses will "split the room", with more points for an equal division of answers. The final round, which is always the "Decisive Dimension", gives prompts with two options where the first is already completed. Players complete the second answer and everyone else picks the option. The player with the most points at the end wins.

Mad Verse City is for 3–8 players and has players use giant robots to out-rap their opponents. In each round, players are given who they are trying to out-rap, and use their device to fill in various prompts given to them. When one player is done making their rap, they may select any activity on their device. The game then runs through each rap using a text-to-speech voice, and once the two players have out-rapped each other, the other players have to choose the rap that they feel is the best. In-game money is gained by the percentage of votes between the two players and a possible "cheer" cash bonus is awarded if they get all votes. The player with the most money at the end wins.

Zeeple Dome is for 1–6 players. Players are contestants in an alien combat arena, the Zeeple Dome, to take down aliens. The game is physics-based and has players slingshot their characters across the game's levels, working together to defeat enemies and gain power-ups for their team. When each enemy is defeated, in-game money is gained in the level.

Patently Stupid is for 3–8 players and is a game of problem-solving, inventing and funding. In the first round, players individually write out problems that need to be solved. These are randomly distributed among players, who are then given the opportunity to draw and name an invention to solve that problem. Players are then able to present their invention to the other players (either using their own voice or allowing the game to present). The other players then use in-game money to fund the invention. Inventions that surpass a funding minimum get a bonus to their inventor. In the final round, one player has to choose a problem for all players to solve. The player with the most money at the end wins.

The Jackbox Party Pack 6 (2019) 
The Jackbox Party Pack 6 was announced in March 2019 during PAX East and was released on October 17, 2019, for PlayStation 4, Xbox One, Nintendo Switch, Microsoft Windows, macOS, Linux, Apple TV, iPad, Amazon Fire TV, Nvidia Shield TV, and Xfinity X1. The Stadia version was available on December 21, 2021.

Trivia Murder Party 2 is for 1–8 players. It is the sequel to Trivia Murder Party and follows a similar format, taking place in a hotel. In addition to new questions, it includes new "Killing Floor" mini-games (including Quiplash), special items which can help or hinder their ability to survive, and a barrier in the endgame's exit, where players have to answer a question correctly before they can escape (the leading player now sees the third answer at the barrier). Also, the audience is their own player, whereas they were a separate entity in the first Trivia Murder Party.

Role Models is for 3–6 players. Players first vote for one of the five categories and then try to match the other players (including themselves) to one of the items from that category. Points are gained between the players if any of their matches is the majority favorite of the group, and extra points can be won if the player marked their answer as "99% sure" and was correct. In case two or more subjects are tied or one player has not been assigned a role by the others, the players will do an in-game experiment. The player with the most points at the end wins.

Joke Boat is for 3–8 players and has players make jokes based on a selected list of words brainstormed by players at the start of the game. During the first two joke rounds, players are given the start of a joke prompt with a missing word they select from a random selection of the brainstormed words. They then finish the joke. Players are then able to perform their joke (either using their own voice or allowing the game to perform), two at a time. The other players and the audience then vote for their favorite of the two. Points are gained by the number of votes between the two players, and a possible "crushed it" point bonus is awarded if they get all votes. The final round has players take an existing joke setup and try to write a better joke than the original one. The player with the most points at the end wins.

Dictionarium is for 3–8 players and involves players creating a fake dictionary. The game can either be played where the players are given a fake word or a fake slang saying as a prompt. The game is played across three rounds. In the first round, players create a definition and vote for their favorite. Each vote gains points for the player that wrote the definition. In the second round, players create a new word or phrase as a synonym and then vote for their favorite. Each vote gains points for the player that wrote the synonym. In the final round, players create a sentence using the word or phrase and then vote for their favorite. Each vote gains points for the player that wrote the sentence. The player with the most points at the end wins.

Push The Button is for 4–10 players and takes place on a spaceship, where one or more players have been assigned as an alien and the other players, as humans, must eject the aliens before a timer runs out. Each round, one player determines an activity on the ship (such as drawing or writing a response to a question) and selects a number of the other crew to participate. The assigned human players get one prompt, but the alien players get a different one that would likely cause some confusion. The results are shown, and players have the time to determine if any response seems suspicious. In later rounds, alien players have "hacks" they can use to either get the correct human prompt or send the alien prompt instead to a human player. At any time before the timer runs down, one player can "push the button" and select the other player(s) they believe are an alien. All other players then vote if they agree or not. In order for the players to be ejected, a unanimous vote must be passed. If the vote fails, the game continues. If the vote succeeds, the game reveals if the players were correct or incorrect. The alien players win if any of the players vote out a human or none of the players push the button before the time is up.

The Jackbox Party Pack 7 (2020) 
The Jackbox Party Pack 7 was released on October 15, 2020, for PlayStation 4, Xbox One, Nintendo Switch, Microsoft Windows, macOS, Linux, Apple TV, iPad, Amazon Fire TV, Nvidia Shield TV, and Xfinity X1. The Stadia version was available on December 7, 2021.

Quiplash 3 is for 3–8 players. It is the third game in the Quiplash series and has the game's signature final round, "The Last Lash", replaced with the "Thriplash", where instead of all players answering the same prompt, each pair of players only receives one prompt instead of the usual two, but must answer with three separate responses. (The host will play with the player in last place if there is an odd number of players in the game.) The game's two-dimensional style art has also been replaced by clay animation.

The Devils and the Details is for 3–8 players. Players become a family of devils, trying to work together to complete a list of mundane chores in certain scenarios (e.g. while a relative is visiting) with each successful task scoring points towards a net score during one of the three days of an episode. Many chores require verbal communication from one player to another to complete which can create confusion. As the players are devils, they are competing against each other. They can complete "selfish" chores, which provide extra points to the player who completed them but also build the selfishness meter, so the other players have to stop that player from doing the selfish chores. When the selfishness meter is full, it creates a family emergency (e.g. a flooded basement, a burning kitchen or a power outage), lowering the total score bar and making it harder to successfully finish a single day. If a day ends with the family score bar that reached the target score, the game proceeds to the next day. If the game ends when the family score bar doesn't reach the target score on either the first or second days, then the VIP player will have to either retry the day or quit the game after the unsuccessful day. The third day however is a challenge. If the day ends with the family score bar not reaching the target score, the episode will be over with just the final scores and some tasks completed (there is no retrying on this day). If the day ends with all of the tasks completed and the family score bar reaching the target score, then the winner will get a prize after the game.

Champ'd Up is for 3–8 players. Players start by creating their own champions and challengers via a drawing interface with unusual monikers and skills, similar to Tee K.O.s T-shirts. The players' creations are then pitted against each other with players and the audience votes for the best one in each round based on how fitting a character is for the given category. In-game money is gained by the percentage of votes between the players that made their champions/challengers and a "Champ'd Up" cash bonus is rewarded if they get all votes. The player with the most money at the end wins. There is also a card game called Champ'd Up: Slam Down, which is available to purchase after the game.

Talking Points is for 3–8 players. Each person starts by creating three speech titles and then choosing one of the three on their devices. Then, one person, as a presenter, is shown a series of text and picture slides which they are seeing for the first time, and has to use their own voice to talk through these to impress the audience, which votes with their reactions. The other people in the game act as assistants to the presenter to select the next slide that the presenter will see from a random selection, which could either help or throw off the presenter. Points are rewarded to the presenter based on how many times the audience reacted and the graph and to the assistant. The players can also write a comment about the presentation. Then all players name the award they will give out. The player with the most points at the end wins. The game also has a free play game mode.

Blather 'Round is for 2–6 players. The game's style is very similar to Charades, where players have to pick a place, story, thing, or person to describe using sentences. While one player gives hints to what they have chosen with fixed sentences, the other players must try to guess what the presenter is describing. Points are awarded to the presenter and whoever correctly guesses what word they chose, as well as those who contributed a helpful hint. The player with the most points at the end wins.

The Jackbox Party Pack 8 (2021) 
The Jackbox Party Pack 8 was released on October 14, 2021, for PlayStation 4, PlayStation 5, Xbox One, Xbox Series X/S, Nintendo Switch, Microsoft Windows, macOS, Linux, Apple TV, iPad, Amazon Fire TV, Nvidia Shield TV, and Xfinity X1. The Stadia version was available on November 16, 2021.

Drawful: Animate is for 3–10 players and is the third game in the Drawful series. The highlight feature is that players create a two-frame animation rather than a single static drawing. Other added features include having three colors to use for drawing and the ability to double down on a guess once per round which awards double points if correct, but if incorrect, awards the player who wrote the fake answer double points instead. A 'friend mode' is also included which has the prompts be about the players.

The Wheel of Enormous Proportions is for 2–8 players and is a trivia game hosted by an all-knowing wheel. At the start of the game, players write a soul-seeking question for the wheel to answer. Players then must earn slices by competing in a trivia round of three questions, each starting with two slices. High scoring players win a slice, with the top scorer winning an extra one. Question types include: selecting answers from a set of twelve, matching answers with their counterpart, guessing what the wheel is thinking based on given clues, writing answers or giving a numerical estimate. On the third question, the top-performing player wins a power slice that can spread across the wheel and when landed on allows them to play a minigame that can impact the scores such as swapping points between two players. During the spinning round, players place their slices onto the wheel and take turns spinning it, earning points when the wheel lands on a slot they picked. The number of points gained increases as the wheel is spun more and points are divided between players who picked the same slot. The spinning round ends when a Spin Meter fills up, and a new trivia round begins. Once a player reaches 20,000 points, any points that player gains from the wheel allows them to spin the Winner Wheel that determines them as the game's winner. The wheel then answers the question the winner wrote at the start of the game.

Job Job is for 3–10 players and is a job interview question game. At the beginning of each round, players answer a number of icebreaker questions in any way they want. Afterwards, all of the responses are shuffled between players where the goal is to answer job interview questions using only words from the icebreaker responses and the question itself. The interview question and the two provided responses are then pitted up and players and the audience vote on their favorite answer. Points are gained via a percentage of votes between the two players, and bonus points are awarded to players whose words were used in a winning answer or if their winning response contains words from three different players. In the final round, instead of interview questions, players create short responses about themselves by answering the same two statements. The player with the most points at the end wins.

The Poll Mine is for 2–10 players. Players are split into two teams of adventurers trapped in a cave by an evil witch. To escape, all players answer an opinion-based poll of eight options in order of preference. Afterwards, each team takes turns opening one from a set of doors, each marked by an answer from the poll. The first round has the teams find the top three most popular answers, while the second has them find the 2nd, 3rd and 4th most popular answers. Each correct answer earns a team a torch, but an incorrect answer causes them to lose a torch. During the final round, the players must open doors from least to most popular. During this round, no torches are gained, but existing torches are still lost from picking an incorrect door. When a team loses their last torch, the other team must pick the correct door to eliminate them and win the game. When everyone correctly opens all doors, the team with the most torches remaining wins. However, if both teams lose all of their torches, it is "game over" for everyone. The game also has a streamer mode where one team consist of the players and the other consisting of the audience who pick a door by majority vote.

Weapons Drawn is for 4–8 players and is a social deduction game. Everyone plays the role of a group of detectives and murderers attending a party. Players draw two murder weapons containing a letter from their name they must hide and name an accomplice to bring as their guest. Players then attempt to murder accomplices by figuring out whoever they think invited them as a guest. If successful, one of the culprit's murder weapons is left at the scene. For reference, the game reveals one weapon drawn by each player. Players vote between two cases to solve and attempt to work together to analyse the murder weapon and vote for who they think committed the crime. During the final round, players in rapid succession, guess every remaining unsolved murder, the murderer gaining points for every detective they fool. Points are given by inviting accomplices that receive a high number of murder attempts, successfully evading being deduced as the culprit and correctly finding the culprits of other murders. The player with the most points at the end wins.

The Jackbox Party Starter (2022) 
The Jackbox Party Starter was released on June 30, 2022. It contains three previously released games: Quiplash 3, Tee K.O, and Trivia Murder Party 2. All three have been updated to include new features, such as moderation and subtitles. Furthermore, additional language translations, including French, German, Italian, and Spanish (European and American), were added.

The Jackbox Party Pack 9 (2022) 
The Jackbox Party Pack 9 was released on October 20, 2022.

Fibbage 4 is for 2–8 players and is the fourth game in the Fibbage series. The game includes new themed episodes, new Final Fibbage rounds with two facts and questions provided by fans of Jackbox Games solicited ahead of the game's release.

Roomerang is for 4–9 players and is themed around a reality show. Players take on roles as characters with a defining trait, and are to give responses that fit that trait as well as working with the traits of other characters. The player with the highest voted response wins the round and an advantage in the following elimination. Eliminated players lose some points but are brought back into the game with a new trait. The player with the most points after five rounds wins.

Junktopia is for 3–8 players. Players select one item of interest from three random items buy that item with money given to them at the beginning. The players can attempt to haggle but this can backfire and cause them to pay more than the original price. They then have to give a fake name and history to these objects and then try to sell it to the other players verbally for the most money compared to other players' items.

Nonsensory is for 3–8 players and is a silly, laid-back writing, drawing and guessing game. The players must guess what is the percentage or on a scale of 1 to 10 how a text-based response or drawing made by another player is based on the prompt given. The players get points relative to how close to the answer they get.

Quixort is for 1–10 players and presents players with a prompt that players will be sorting answers under, such as "animals by number of legs". The answers are then presented as falling blocks which the players must then try to place in the proper order. The game is played in teams, but a separate game within the Party Pack, Quixort Forever, allows a single player or a single team try to proceed as far as possible.

The Jackbox Party Pack 10 (2023) 
On February 8, 2023, Jackbox Games announced a tenth Party Pack would release in Fall 2023.

Reception
Jackbox Games stated that sales jumped by up to 1,000% from March to May 2020, the first three months of the COVID-19 pandemic shutdown. Though sales since leveled off after that point, the company said that its playerbase still grew, doubling from 100 million players in 2019 to 200 million by October 2020 due to the ongoing pandemic.

PC Gamer said "the Jackbox games are the perfect way to beat the social distancing blues". Wired considered the Party Packs, along with Fall Guys and Among Us, as popular narrative-less games during the pandemic, as they helped to avoid the "cultural trauma" the pandemic had brought.

See also
 Use Your Words, a video game similar to games in The Jackbox Party Pack

References

External links
 

2014 video games
Android (operating system) games
IOS games
Linux games
MacOS games
Nintendo Switch games
Party video games
PlayStation 3 games
PlayStation 4 games
Video game franchises
Video game franchises introduced in 2014
Video games developed in the United States
Windows games
Xbox One games